Emanuel Krescenc Liška (19 April 1852, in Mikulovice – 18 January 1903, in Prague) was a Bohemian painter and illustrator. Most of his works were on religious themes, but he also created scenes from works of poetry.

Biography 
Not long after he was born, the family moved to Milevsko, where his father had found work as a farm manager. Their stay was short, however, as his father soon died and his mother took him to Prague. When he was nine, his mother also died, leaving him almost nothing. 

As soon as he was old enough, he began taking art lessons, but had to support himself by tutoring and working as an assistant at the local gymnasium. He achieved second place in a contest to create designs for the hall of the National Theatre, then was awarded a contract by the city government to copy the designs on the calendar dial of the Prague astronomical clock. 

In 1879, he and Jakub Schikaneder were chosen to decorate the Royal Box at the National Theatre, but their work was destroyed by fire only two years later. Liška used his commission to attend classes with Otto Seitz at the Academy of Fine Arts, Munich. The works he created there were shown at the General Land Centennial Exhibition (1891). Despite these successes, his oil paintings never sold well. 

From 1888, he served as a Professor at the Academy of Arts, Architecture and Design. He died suddenly, in 1903, of a stroke. A memorial poem in his honor was written by Bohdan Kaminský.

Selected paintings

References

Further reading
Vilém Witenweber. "Emanuel Krescenc Liška" from Zlatá Praha, Vol.1 #51
 František Xaver Harlas, Souborná výstava obrazů Em. Krescence Lišky na paměť 20. výročí jeho smrti, (exhibition catalog), Topičův Salon, Prague, 1922

External links 

1852 births
1903 deaths
People from Mikulovice (Znojmo District)
People from the Margraviate of Moravia
19th-century Czech painters
19th-century Czech male artists
Religious artists
Czech male painters
Academic staff of the Academy of Arts, Architecture and Design in Prague